Funeral Dirge for the Rotting Sun is Goatwhore's second full-length studio album. A music video was made for the song "Blood Guilt Eucharist".

Track listing

Personnel 
Ben Falgoust - vocals
Sammy Duet - guitars
Pat Bruders - bass
Zak Nolan - drums

References 

2003 albums
Goatwhore albums
Noise Records albums